Kvås Church is a parish church of the Church of Norway in Lyngdal Municipality in Agder county, Norway. It is located in the village of Kvås. It is one of the churches for the Lyngdal parish which is part of the Lister og Mandal prosti (deanery) in the Diocese of Agder og Telemark. The white, wooden church was built in a long church design in 1836 using plans drawn up by an unknown architect. The church seats about 300 people.

History
The earliest existing historical records of the church date back to the late 1600s, but the church was described as "old" at that time. The old timber-framed building was in constant need of repairs, which were carried out repeatedly. In 1785, a rock wall was constructed around the church cemetery which encircled the church building. In 1834, the old church building was torn down and over the next two years, a new church building was constructed on the same site.

See also
List of churches in Agder og Telemark

References

Lyngdal
Churches in Agder
Wooden churches in Norway
19th-century Church of Norway church buildings
Churches completed in 1836